Peter Andreas (born 1965) is an American political scientist. Since 2014, he has been the John Hay Professor of International Studies at Brown University's Watson Institute for International and Public Affairs. Common themes of across his work include war, borders, and shadow economies in Europe and the Americas.

Childhood 
Peter Andreas was born in 1965 in Detroit, Michigan. His mother Carol grew up in an Mennonite community and became radicalized as a young adult, embracing radical feminism and Marxism. Carol's radical politics were incompatible with those of Andreas' father, Carl, leading her to file for divorce in 1969. Without Carl's consent, Carol fled to Berkeley, California and established a commune. In the 1970s, Andreas followed his mother in her travels around South America, living in Ecuador, Chile, and Peru. The family fled Chile in 1973 following the coup d'état that deposed President Salvador Allende's socialist government.

After returning to the United States, Carol lost custody of Peter; in response, she kidnapped her son and fled to Peru with a new husband. Andreas and his mother ultimately returned to the United States, settling in Denver. Andreas attended East High School; he enrolled at Tufts University though ultimately transferred to Swarthmore College, where he earned a Bachelor of Arts in political science. Andreas received an M.A. and Ph.D. in government from Cornell University.

Scholarship 
Prior to joining Brown in 2006, Andreas was a Harvard Academy Scholar at Harvard University and Brookings Research Fellow at the Brookings Institution.

Books 

 , with Eva Bertram, Morris Blachman, and Kenneth Sharpe
 
 , with Ethan Nadelmann

References

External links 

 

1965 births
Swarthmore College alumni
Cornell University alumni
Brown University faculty
People from Detroit
Living people